Wallroda Dam is a dam near Radeberg, Germany.

Construction
The dam was built between 1986 and 1989 in  near Radeberg and south of Großröhrsdorf, with the intended purpose of supplying water to farms and fisheries in the area. It also has a small part in regional flood prevention strategies.

Recreational activities

Camping
A campsite can be found on the northern bank of the dam. Additionally, there are a restaurant and a miniature golf course.

Swimming
There are no water rescue facilities, anyone who enters the water does so at their own risk.

Fishing
The dam's reservoir is listed with the Deutscher Anglerverband (German Angling Association). For environmental protection reasons, fishing is only permitted in designated areas.

References

See also
List of dams and reservoirs in Germany

Dams completed in 1989
Dams in Saxony